The 2021–22 Ligue Magnus season was the 101st season of the Ligue Magnus, the top level of ice hockey in France.

Teams

Regular season

Statistics

Scoring leaders 
The following players led the league in points, at the conclusion of matches played on 19 February 2022.

Leading goaltenders 
The following goaltenders led the league in goals against average, provided that they have played at least 70% of their team's minutes, at the conclusion of matches played on 19 February 2022.

Playoffs

Bracket

Quarterfinals

Semifinals

Finals

Play-out 

Diables Rouges de Briançon is relegated, unless the Division 1 champion does not apply for the Magnus League promotion.

Final rankings

References

External links 
Official website
Ligue Magnus on eurohockey.com
Ligue Magnus on eliteprospects.com

1
Fra
Ligue Magnus seasons